Bute or BUTE may refer to:

People 
 Marquess of Bute, a title in the Peerage of Great Britain; includes lists of baronets, earls and marquesses of Bute
 Lord of Bute, a title in medieval Scotland, including a list of lords
 Lucian Bute (born 1980), Romanian-Canadian boxer
 Mary Ellen Bute (1906–1983), American film animator

Places 
 Isle of Bute, Argyll and Bute, Scotland
Sound of Bute, a channel separating the Isle of Bute from Arran
 County of Bute, also known as Buteshire, in Scotland
 Bute, South Australia, a small town on the Yorke Peninsula, Australia
 Bute, Kenya, a town in Wajir County, Kenya
 Bute Inlet, British Columbia, Canada
 Bute County, North Carolina, United States
 Bute Street, Cardiff, Wales
 Bute Park, a park in Cardiff
 Bute Street, Hong Kong

Drugs 
 Phenylbutazone, also called "bute", an anti-inflammatory drug commonly used for horses
 Clenbuterol, occasionally called "bute", a slang term for a stimulant bronchodilator veterinary drug

Other uses 
 Bute (mythology), also Budtė, the Lithuanian goddess of wisdom
 Bute (Greek mythology), also Butes, an Argonaut in Greek mythology
 Bute Medical School, the medical school of the University of St Andrews
 MV Bute, a Caledonian MacBrayne ferry
 MV Bute (1954), a Clyde vehicle ferry from 1954 to 1978
 Bute House, Edinburgh, official residence of the First Minister of Scotland
 Bute Building, a Cardiff University building
 Budapest University of Technology and Economics

See also 
 Butte (disambiguation)
 Butes, a name